SS Blücher was a  built by Blohm & Voss Shipbuilders, Hamburg, Germany, in 1902 for the Hamburg America Line, to sail under German flag. She measured 12,334 gross register tons and was 550 (bp) feet long by 62 feet wide. Steam quadruple-expansion engines powered twin screws. Her service speed was 16 knots. She originally carried 2,102 passengers, including 333 first class, 169 second class, and 1,600 third class, on four decks with a steel hull, and was served by a crew of 252. She was fitted with two masts and two funnels. She saw Hamburg-New York and Hamburg-South America service. 

She was the sister ship to the SS Moltke.

History
The Blücher was launched on November 23, 1901. She set out on her maiden voyage on June 7, 1902, proceeding from Hamburg to Boulogne to Southampton, then finally to New York, where she arrived at Ellis Island on June 28. She serviced this route until 1911.

In 1912, she was rebuilt, with luxury suites added to her boat deck.

She was interned at Pernambuco, Brazil in August 1914. On June 1, 1917, she was seized by the Brazilian government, who renamed her Leopoldina. On February 27, 1918, she was chartered to the French government.

On March 11, 1920, she began her first voyage for Compagnie Générale Transatlantique (CGT, "French Line") from New York to Le Havre. In December 1921, she was laid up. In March 1923, she was sold to CGT and renamed Suffren, as which on May 8, 1923, she made her first voyage, Le Havre to New York. At this time, she could accommodate 500 passengers in first class and 250 in third class.

She was laid up again in 1928 and scrapped in Genoa in 1929.

References

External links
 

 

1901 ships
Ocean liners
Steamships of Germany
Passenger ships of France
Passenger ships of Germany
Ships built in Hamburg
Ships of the Compagnie Générale Transatlantique
Ships of the Hamburg America Line
Barbarossa-class ocean liners